The 2011 Conference USA baseball tournament was held at Trustmark Park in Pearl, Mississippi, from May 25 through 29, 2011.  The winner received Conference USA's automatic bid to the 2011 NCAA Division I baseball tournament. The tournament consists of eight teams split into two four-team pods, with the teams with the best record in each pod going on to a single-game final.

Regular season results

SMU, Tulsa, and UTEP do not field baseball teams. Marshall did not make the tournament.
In the event of a tie, the team that won the series is designated the higher seed.

Bracket
# indicates the number of innings if not 9.

Finish order

† - Winner of the tournament and received an automatic bid to the NCAA tournament.
# - Received an at-large bid to the NCAA tournament.

All-Tournament Team

(*)Denotes Unanimous Selection

References

External links
 2011 C-USA Baseball Championship

Tournament
Conference USA Baseball Tournament
Conference USA baseball tournament
Conference USA baseball tournament
Baseball in Mississippi
College sports in Mississippi
History of Rankin County, Mississippi
Sports competitions in Mississippi
Tourist attractions in Rankin County, Mississippi